Gmina Bolesławiec may refer to either of the following rural administrative districts in Poland:
Gmina Bolesławiec, Lower Silesian Voivodeship
Gmina Bolesławiec, Łódź Voivodeship